Khristo Doychinov (born 19 January 1944) is a former Bulgarian basketball player. He competed in the men's tournament at the 1968 Summer Olympics.

References

1944 births
Living people
Bulgarian men's basketball players
Olympic basketball players of Bulgaria
Basketball players at the 1968 Summer Olympics
Basketball players from Sofia